Christopher Walken is an American actor and comedian, whose career has spanned over 50 years with appearances in theater, film, and television. He has appeared in over 100 movies and television shows, including A View to a Kill, At Close Range, The Deer Hunter, King of New York, Batman Returns, Pulp Fiction, Sleepy Hollow, True Romance, and Catch Me If You Can, as well as music videos by recording artists such as Madonna and Fatboy Slim.

Walken's early career was primarily in theater and television where he often played small roles. During this period of his career, Walken was credited as "Ken Walken" and later as "Ronnie Walken", until he finally settled on "Christopher Walken". He began acting in films in 1969 and, after a series of increasingly larger roles, won an Academy Award in 1978 as Best Supporting Actor for his role in The Deer Hunter. Since then, Walken has become a highly sought-after actor, typically performing in numerous films every year.

Walken has been a primary character in two film franchises: as Gabriel the fallen angel in The Prophecy series, and as Jacob Witting in the made-for-television films based on Patricia MacLachlan's Sarah, Plain and Tall novels. Other notable roles include Johnny Smith in The Dead Zone, Captain Koons in Pulp Fiction, and Frank Abagnale Sr. in Catch Me If You Can. He also sings and dances, as seen in some of his films including: Pennies from Heaven, Romance & Cigarettes,  and Hairspray.

Film
Following his early (1950s) work in television and theater, Walken has acted primarily in films. This list includes credits in studio films, independent films, animated films, and made-for-television movies. The list includes the 2001 short five-minute film Popcorn Shrimp which Walken wrote, produced and directed.

Television
In the beginning of his acting career, Walken had relatively small roles in episodes for a number of television shows. This list includes appearances in various episodes of fictional shows, while excluding appearances as himself on talk shows, interview shows, ceremonies, and the like.

 III Credited as "Ronnie Walken".

Theater
In addition to acting for film and television, Walken has acted in numerous Broadway and off-Broadway theater productions. He has acted in more than 100 additional plays including some by Shakespeare. This list includes the most popular of them.

Video games 
 1996 Ripper as Detective Vince Magnotta
 1996 Privateer 2: The Darkening as David Hassan
 2003 True Crime: Streets of LA as Sergeant George
 2005 True Crime: New York City as Gabriel Whitting

Music videos 
 1993 Madonna – "Bad Girl" as Madonna's Guardian Angel
 1995 Skid Row – "Breakin' Down" as Gabriel from The Prophecy trilogy
 2001 Fatboy Slim – "Weapon of Choice" (also co-choreographer)

CD 
 1997 "The Raven" by Edgar Allan Poe on Closed on Account of Rabies

See also 
 List of awards and nominations received by Christopher Walken

References 
 General

 
 
 
 
 

 Specific

External links 
 
 
 Interview with Christopher Walken on set of The Irishman

Male actor filmographies
American filmographies